The battle of the Bear's Ford took place in June 1608, when a government army of Boyar Ivan Kurakin defeated Lithuanian Colonel Alexander Lisowsky, in service of False Dmitry II.

Prelude 
In March 1608, Lisowski separated from False Dmitry, defeated government troops at Zaraisk and captured Kolomna. With captured cannon and prisoners, Lisowski moved to join the main forces of False Dmitry in Tushino.

Battle 
While crossing the Moskva River between Kolomna and Moscow,  burdened with captives and a wagon train, Lisowczycy  was suddenly attacked by an elite cavalry regiment loyal to Tsar Vasily IV. Accustomed to maneuvering battles, Lisowczycy suffered a serious defeat and lost all of the Kolomna spoils.

Aftermath 
After this defeat, Lisowczycy escaped back to Tushino. False Dmitry II lost important siege equipment and could not attack fortified Moscow, but continued blockade instead.

References 

1608 in Russia
17th-century military history of Russia
1608 in Europe
Med
History of Moscow Oblast
Conflicts in 1608